Alcohol-related crime refers to criminal activities that involve alcohol use as well as violations of regulations covering the sale or use of alcohol; in other words, activities violating the alcohol laws. Underage drinking and drunk driving are the most prevalent alcohol‐specific offenses in the United States and a major problem in many, if not most, countries worldwide. Similarly, arrests for alcohol-related crimes constitute a high proportion of all arrests made by police in the U.S. and elsewhere.

Crime perpetrators are much more likely to be intoxicated than crime victims. Alcohol availability and consumption rates and alcohol rates are positively associated with nuisance, loitering, panhandling, and disorderly conduct in open spaces; domestic violence; as well as violent crimes, through specifics differ between particular countries and cultures. Research found that factors that increase the likelihood of alcohol‐related violence include difficult temperament, hyperactivity, hostile beliefs, history of family violence, poor school performance, delinquent peers, criminogenic beliefs about alcohol's effects, impulsivity, and antisocial personality disorder.

In the early 2000s, the monetary cost of alcohol-related crime in the United States alone has been estimated at over $205 billion, twice the economic cost of all other drug-related crimes. In a similar period in the United Kingdom, the cost of crime and its antisocial effects was estimated at £7.3 billion. Another estimate for the UK for yearly cost of alcohol-related crime suggested double that estimate, at between £8 and 13 billion. Risky patterns of drinking are particularly problematic in and around Russia, Mexico and some parts of Africa.

The relation between alcohol and violence is not yet fully understood, as its impact on different individual varies. While alcohol use correlates positively with crimes and violence, there is no simple, causal and direct relationship. Studies and theories of alcohol abuse suggest, among others, that use of alcohol likely reduces the offender's perception and awareness of consequences of their actions. The World Health Organization has noted that out of social problems created by the harmful use of alcohol, "crime and violence related to alcohol consumption" are likely the most significant issue.

Types
Some crimes are uniquely tied to alcohol, such as public intoxication or underage drinking, while others are simply more likely to occur together with alcohol consumption.

Domestic violence and child abuse

Domestic violence typically co‐occurs with alcohol abuse. Alcohol use has been reported as a factor by two-thirds of domestic abuse victims. Moderate drinkers are more frequently engaged in intimate violence than are light drinkers and abstainers, however generally it is heavy and/or binge drinkers who are involved in the most chronic and serious forms of aggression. The odds, frequency, and severity of physical attacks are all positively correlated with alcohol use. In turn, violence decreases after behavioral marital alcoholism treatment. Studies also suggest there may be links between alcohol abuse and child abuse.

Driving under the influence

Driving under the influence (DUI) or driving while intoxicated (DWI), is the crime of driving a motor vehicle while impaired by alcohol or other drugs including those prescribed by physicians.

With alcohol consumption, a drunk driver's level of intoxication is typically determined by a measurement of blood alcohol content or BAC; but this can also be expressed as a breath test measurement, often referred to as a BrAC. A BAC or BrAC measurement in excess of the specific threshold level, such as 0.08%, defines the criminal offense with no need to prove impairment. In some jurisdictions, there is an aggravated category of the offense at a higher BAC level, such as 0.12%, 0.15% or 0.25%. In many jurisdictions, police officers can conduct field tests of suspects to look for signs of intoxication.

Drug facilitated sexual assault

Alcohol abuse increases the risk of individuals either experiencing or perpetrating sexual violence.  Drug-facilitated sexual assault (DFSA) is a sexual assault carried out after the victim has become incapacitated due to having consumed alcohol or other drugs. Alcohol remains the most commonly used predator drug, being readily available as well as legal, and is said to be used in the majority of sexual assaults. Many assailants use alcohol because their victims often willingly imbibe it, and can be encouraged to drink enough to lose inhibitions or consciousness. Sex with an unconscious victim is considered rape in most if not all jurisdictions, and some assailants have committed "rapes of convenience" whereby they have assaulted a victim after he or she had become unconscious from drinking too much.

Methanol-adulterated alcohol

Outbreaks of methanol poisoning have occurred when methanol is used to adulterate moonshine (bootleg liquor).  Methanol has a high toxicity in humans. If as little as 10 mL of pure methanol is ingested, for example, it can break down into formic acid, which can cause permanent blindness by destruction of the optic nerve, and 30 mL is potentially fatal, although the median lethal dose is typically 100 mL (3.4 fl oz) (i.e. 1–2 mL/kg body weight of pure methanol). Reference dose for methanol is 0.5 mg/kg/day. Toxic effects take hours to start, and effective antidotes can often prevent permanent damage. Because of its similarities in both appearance and odor to ethanol (the alcohol in beverages), it is difficult to differentiate between the two.

Public drunkenness 

Public drunkenness or intoxication is a common problem in many jurisdictions. The offenders are often lower class individuals and this crime has a very high recidivism rate, with numerous instances of repeated instances of the arrest, jail, release without treatment cycle. The high number of arrests for public drunkenness often reflects rearrests of the same offenders.

Robbery and violent crimes

Robbery and violent crimes often involve alcohol use, and there is a positive correlation between such crimes and alcohol use. 15% of robberies, 63% of intimate partner violence incidents, 37% of sexual assaults, 45-46% of physical assaults and 40-45% of homicides in the United States involved use of alcohol. A 1983 study for the United States found that 54% of violent crime perpetrators, arrested in that country, had been consuming alcohol before their offenses. In the United Kingdom, in 2015/2016, 39% of those involved in violent crimes were under alcohol influence. International studies are similar, with an estimate that 63% of violent crimes worldwide involves the use of alcohol.

Prevention and enforcement 

Criminologist Hung‐En Sung has concluded in 2016 that with regards to reducing drunk driving, law enforcement has not generally proven to be effective. Worldwide, the majority of those driving under the influence do not end up arrested. At least two thirds of alcohol‐involved fatalities involve repeat drinking drivers. Sung, commenting on measures for controlling drunk driving and alcohol‐related accidents, noted that the ones that have proven effective include "lowering legal blood alcohol concentrations, controlling liquor outlets, nighttime driving curfews for minors, educational treatment programs combined with license suspension for offenders, and court monitoring of high‐risk offenders." In general, programs aimed at reducing society's consumption of alcohol, including education in schools, are seen as an effective long-term solution. Strategies aiming to reduce alcohol consumption among adult offenders have various estimates of effectiveness.

Alcohol use is stereotypically associated with crime, and therefore policing alcohol‐related street disorder and enforcing compliance checks of alcohol‐dispensing businesses has proven successful in reducing public perception of and fear of criminal activities.

Taxes
 Pigovian taxes, which are to pay for the damage to society caused by these goods.
 Sin taxes are used to increase the price in an effort to lower their use, or failing that, to increase and find new sources of revenue.

See also
Alcohol myopia
Rum-running
Drug-related crime
Legal drinking age
List of countries by alcohol consumption per capita
Prohibition of alcohol

References

Crime by type
Alcohol abuse
Alcohol and health
Alcohol law